"Your Forevers Don't Last Very Long" is a single by American country music artist Jean Shepard.  Released in April 1967, it was the first single and title track from the album Your Forevers Don't Last Very Long.  The song reached #167on the Billboard Hot Country Singles chart.

Chart performance

References 

1967 singles
Jean Shepard songs
Songs written by Cliffie Stone
Song recordings produced by Ken Nelson (American record producer)
1967 songs
Capitol Records singles